Abir Chatterjee is an Indian actor who mainly works in Bengali cinema. He started his career with Bengali television and made his debut in Bengali cinema in 2009 as a lead with Cross Connection.

He has acted in many Bengali serials including  Proloy Asche  Ruposhi Bangla, Shasuri Zindabad and Khuje Berai Kacher Manush, Banhishikha, Sudhu Tomari Jonno, Ek Aakasher Niche, Janmobhumi.

He appeared in Bengali movies as Byomkesh Bakshi and Feluda. The Indian Express said he brought "elegant élan and confidence" to his role in The Royal Bengal Tiger.

Abir Chatterjee's great lost film is his screen debut in the 2004 independent period drama Robibar Bikelbela, in which he portrays a disillusioned former Naxalite revolutionary in post-Emergency Bengal. No copies of the film have been found yet.

2014 saw his emergence in a solo leading role in the critically acclaimed film Hrid Majharey by debutant director Ranjan Ghosh.
After acting in this film, he went on to top the list of Calcutta Times Most Desirable Men of 2014.

Films

Television, television films, Web Series, and short films 
Avrodh Season 2 on Sony Liv
Sa Re Ga Ma Pa Zee Bangla 2022
 Dance Bangla Dance  (Season 11) Host (to replace Ankush Hazra for a few episodes as he was severely ill and suffering from high fever)
Sa Re Ga Ma Pa Zee Bangla 2020
Proloy Asche
Shomoy (Television series) 
 Bhool (Telefilm)
Mom Ronge Somudro (Telefilm) 
Scandal (Telefilm)
Atithi (Telefilm)
Ballavpurer Rupkatha (Telefilm)
Credit Card (Telefilm)
Hotath Megh (Telefilm)
My Sweet Valentine (Telefilm)
 Banhishikha (Television series)
 Ekti Mrityur Pore (Short film)
 Ek Aakasher Niche (Mega serial) (Zee Bangla)
 Maya (Short film)
 Khuje Beria Kacher Manush (Television series)
Sasuri Jindabad (Television) (Zee Bangla)

References

External links
 Filmography of Abir Chatterjee on IMDb

Indian filmographies
Male actor filmographies